Allan Combs (born 1942) is an American consciousness theorist who studies the complexity of the mind. Biologist, theoretical neuroscientist and philosopher Walter Jackson Freeman III, wrote of Combs: [His work] "transcends the fading antimony of The Two Cultures and demonstrates the unity of human knowledge in his synthesis of modern brain dynamics with a broad sweep of history and mythology. It is a stunning achievement."

Education and academic career 
Combs attended the University of Ohio in the early 1960s, first studying physics and then switching to psychology. During these studies, he overcame impediments due to dyslexia, something he later noted would influence his thinking about psychology.

He then restarted his graduate education in clinical psychology at the University of Georgia, and at the same time started taking courses and doing research on single-cell recordings of neurons, and mathematically modeled their activity on early versions of the computer.  Through this time he was reading Carl Jung, European phenomenology, Eastern spirituality Abraham Maslow, Carl Rogers, and John C. Lilly; he also participated in gestalt therapy and human potentials workshops.

After graduating he taught biology and psychology for a year at Earlham College in Indiana, then for about a decade at a small college in Missouri.  While he was there he read Charles Tart  and was inspired by his application of systems theory to psychology.  In the early 1980s he moved to a college in North Carolina. In the mid-1990s he started corresponding and then collaborating with David Loye, who invited Combs to join a group formed around the ideas of Ervin László.  Reading László furthered his interests in systems and consciousness and he was soon invited to join László's General Evolutionary Research Group.  In 1989 Combs learned of the work of Frederick Abraham, who was beginning to meld chaos theory and psychology, and worked with him to found The Society for Chaos Theory in Psychology and the Life Sciences.

As of 2020 Combs held appointments at the California Institute of Integral Studies, where he built the program in consciousness studies in 2015, and The Graduate Institute in Connecticut. He also was Professor Emeritus at the University of North Carolina-Asheville.

As of 2020 he had authored over 200 articles, chapters, and books on consciousness and the brain.  Much of his work has been accomplished in collaboration with colleagues Ervin Laszlo and Stanley Krippner. He is also known for his collaboration with Ken Wilber.

He is the founder, Academic Advisor, and President Emeritus of The Society for Consciousness Studies, co-founder of The Laszlo Institute of New Paradigm Research and a member of the one-hundred member Club of Budapest. He is the Senior Editor of Consciousness: Ideas and Research for the Twenty First Century, co-editor of the Journal of Conscious Evolution, Associate Editor of Dynamical Psychology.

Combs won the National Teaching Award of the Association of Graduate Liberal Studies Programs for 2002/2003 and in the same year held the UNCA Honorary Ruth and Leon Feldman Professorship.

Bibliography 
Books
 Combs, A. (1995). The Radiance of being: Complexity, chaos, and the evolution of consciousness. Edinburgh: Floris Books; 1996, St Paul, MN: Paragon House. (Winner of the Scientific and Medical Network book of the year award.)
 Combs, A. (2009). Consciousness explained better: Towards an integral understanding of the multifaceted nature of consciousness. St Paul, MN: Paragon House.
 Combs, A., & Holland, M. (1990). Synchronicity: Science, myth and the trickster. New York: Paragon House. (Second edition with foreword by Ervin Laszlo; 1995. Third edition with foreword by Robin Robertson; 2001.)

Chapters and articles
 Combs, A. (2014). My life in chaos. In A. Montuori (Ed.). Journeys in Complexity: Autobiographical Accounts by Leading Systems and Complexity Thinkers. London: Routledge.
 Combs, A. (2013). El poder del diálogo. Athanor, 98, 30–39.
 Combs, A. (2015). Transcend and include: Wilber's contributions to transpersonal psychology. In G. Hartelius and H. Frideman (Eds.). Wiley-Blackwell Handbook of Transpersonal Psychology. (pp. 166–186). Hoboken, NJ: Wiley-Blackwell.
 Combs, A. (2015). The nature of consciousness. In Jennie A. Davis, and Daniel Pitchford (Eds.). Stanley Krippner: A Life of Dreams, Myths, and Visions; Essays on his Contributions and Influence (pp. 21–40).  Colorado Springs, CO: University Professors Press.
 Combs, A. (2016, Spring). Consciousness studies - An overview. Consciousness: Ideas and Research for the Twenty First Century, 1 (3). 
 
 Combs, A. (2016). Consciousness: The Damnedest Thing. A Young Person’s Guide to the Roots of Experience. Cosmos and History: The Journal of Natural and Social Philosophy, 12 (2), 58–66. 
 Combs, A. (2017). Consciousness, collective consciousness, enlightenment, and collective enlightenment. Spanda Journal. 
 Combs, A. & Krippner, S. (2008). Collective consciousness and the social brain. In C. Whitehead (Ed.). The Origin of Consciousness in the Social World. Exeter, UK: Imprint Academic.
 Combs, A. & Krippner, S. (2016). The holographic theory of consciousness. In E. Laszlo, and A. Laszlo (Eds.). What is Reality: The New Face of Cosmos and Consciousness. NYC: Select Books. (pp. 120–125).
 Havens, R., & Combs, A. (2016).Growth and happiness in the Human Personality. Consciousness: Ideas and Research for the Twenty First Century, Issue 4.

References

External links 
 Source Integralis, Combs' website

21st-century American psychologists
American consciousness researchers and theorists
1942 births
Living people
Ohio University alumni
University of North Carolina at Asheville faculty
20th-century American psychologists